"Borderline" is a song by Swedish singer Tove Styrke from her second studio album, Kiddo (2015). The song was released as the album's second single on 9 October 2014 through Sony Music. It is also included on the EP Borderline (2014).  Styrke and Janne Kask wrote the song, with production by Johan T. Karlsson. "Borderline" is an electropop song.

Background
Six months prior to its release, "Borderline" appeared in remixed form by Henning Fürst on a compilation album created as part of the election campaign of Swedish political party Feminist Initiative in April 2014. The official version of the track premiered on Sveriges Radio P3 on 8 October 2014; it was also uploaded to Styrke's SoundCloud account. Sony Music released "Borderline" for digital download and streaming the following day.

Composition and lyrics
"Borderline" is a three-minute and 23-second electropop song with reggae influences. Nolan Feeney of Time described Styrke's vocal style as an "adopted patois".

Reception
"Borderline" received critical acclaim. Mellanie Battolla of The Line of Best Fit wrote that the single established Styrke as "a shape-shifting pop singer that can ease herself in all music genres".

"Borderline" did not enter the Sverigetopplistan singles chart, but received a gold certification by the Swedish Recording Industry Association (GLF), indicating sales of 20,000 units.

Music video

Icelandic filmmaker Rúnar Ingi directed the accompanying music video for "Borderline". It was filmed on location in the former mining settlement Pyramiden on the Norwegian archipelago of Svalbard.

Track listing
Digital single
 "Borderline"3:23

Digital single
 "Borderline" (Salvatore Ganacci remix)3:00

Digital single
 "Borderline" (Dan Lissvik remix)4:08

Digital single
 "Borderline" (Vanic remix)4:16

Credits and personnel
Credits are adapted from the Kiddo liner notes.

Tove Styrkesongwriting
Janne Kasksongwriting
Johan T. Karlssonproduction, mixing
Tom Coynemastering

Charts

Certifications

Release history

References

External links

2014 songs
2014 singles
Tove Styrke songs
Songs written by Tove Styrke
Sony Music singles